Yelizovsky District is an administrative and municipal district (raion) of Kamchatka Krai, Russia, one of the eleven in the krai. It is located in the south of the krai. Its administrative center is the town of Yelizovo (which is not administratively a part of the district). As of the 2010 Census, the total population of the district was 24,566.

Administrative and municipal status
Within the framework of administrative divisions, Yelizovsky District is one of the eleven in the krai. The town of Yelizovo serves as its administrative center, despite being incorporated separately as a town under krai jurisdiction—an administrative unit with the status equal to that of the districts.

As a municipal division, the district is incorporated as Yelizovsky Municipal District, with Yelizovo Town Under Krai Jurisdiction being incorporated within it as Yelizovskoye Urban Settlement.

Subdivisions

Demographics

Ethnic composition (2010):
 Russians – 89.3%
 Ukrainians – 3.5%
 Koreans – 1.1%
 Tatars – 0.7%
 Others – 5.4%

References

Notes

Sources

Districts of Kamchatka Krai
States and territories established in 1949
